HD 326823, also known as V1104 Scorpii, is a binary star containing a unique emission-line star, which is in the midst of transitioning to a nitrogen-rich Wolf-Rayet star, as well as being a candidate Luminous blue variable, located 4,142 light years away in the constellation of Scorpius. The primary is very evolved, because it is composed of almost entirely helium, and only 3% of it is still hydrogen, and it has lost most of its mass to the now-very-massive secondary. The underlying mechanisms and mass transfers in the system are comparable to other W Serpentis systems, such as Beta Lyrae and RY Scuti.

Properties 
The primary star's stellar wind has a very low terminal velocity of just 200 kilometres per second and through that wind is losing  (about ) per year.

Orbit 
The primary and the secondary orbit each other every 6.123 days. The orbit has an eccentricity of about 0.17, and is inclined at about 45 degrees. The argument of periapsis is about 197 degrees.

Environment and evolution 

The visible star (the primary) is a mass donor, and is transferring mass to the unseen secondary, which is enshrouded in a thick accretion torus. As a result, only the primary (mass donor) is observed. Mass loss occurring at both the L2 and L3 points suggests a large circumbinary disk, which is the source of stationary emission lines in the spectrum. The complex light curve is probably due to the tidal distortion of the primary, as well as variations in the thickness of the torus.

The visible star in HD 326823 has been stripped of its outer layers by the secondary star. If this continues, the system may evolve into a system similar to Gamma Velorum, where the mass donor is now a hydrogen-stripped Wolf-Rayet star, that is orbiting a more massive O-type star, formerly the secondary. 

Hydrogen-deficient donor stars in W Ser-esque binaries, such as the primary in HD 326823, will likely explode in Type Ib/c supernovae, after they evolve into Wolf-Rayet stars, and understanding the pre-SN evolution of these stars is critical to the interpretation and modeling of the supernovae they produce.

Notes

References

Wolf–Rayet stars
Scorpii, V1104
Scorpius (constellation)
Luminous blue variables
Emission-line stars
Spectroscopic binaries